The Curtiss-Wright CW-22 was a 1940s American general-purpose advanced training monoplane aircraft built by the Curtiss-Wright Corporation. It was operated by the United States Navy as a scout trainer with the designation SNC-1 Falcon.

Design and development
Developed at the Curtiss-Wright St. Louis factory, the CW-22 was developed from the CW-19 via the single-seat CW-21 light fighter-interceptor. The prototype first flew in 1940. With less power and performance than the CW-21, the two-seat, low-wing, all-metal CW-A22 had retractable tailwheel landing gear, with the main gear retracting rearward into underwing fairings.

The CW-22 was seen as either a civilian sport or training monoplane or suitable as a combat trainer, reconnaissance and general-purpose aircraft for military use. The prototype CW-A22 Falcon (U.S. civilian registration NC18067) was used as a company demonstrator and is one of four of the type still in existence. An SNC-1 is on display at the U.S. Navy's National Museum of Naval Aviation, at NAS Pensacola, Florida.

Operational history
The main customer for the aircraft equipped with the Wright R-975 Whirlwind air-cooled radial engine was the Royal Netherlands East Indies Army Air Force and 36 were exported. The aircraft had to be delivered to the Dutch in Australia due to the advancing Japanese forces. A developed version, the CW-22B, was sold to Turkey (50), the Netherlands East Indies (25) and in small numbers in South America. Some of the Dutch aircraft were captured and operated by the Imperial Japanese Army Air Force. The CW-22 and CW-22B were armed with two machine guns, one fixed.

An unarmed advanced training version (CW-22N) was demonstrated to the United States Navy. To help to meet the expanding need for training, the Navy ordered 150 aircraft in November 1940. Further orders brought the total to 305 aircraft which were designated SNC-1 Falcon.

Curtiss converted a CW-19 into a CW-22 demonstrator. They hoped to use this to sell the CW-22 to China. The aircraft was obtained by the Burma Volunteer Air Force, and later used by the Royal Air Force in India. It was scrapped in 1946.

Variants

CW-A22
Prototype
CW-22
Production armed variant for the Royal Netherlands East Indies Army Air Force, 36 built.
CW-22B
Improved armed variant, approx 100 built.
SNC-1 Falcon (CW-22N)
United States Navy designation for the CW-22N, 305 built (BuNo 6290-6439, 05085-05234, 32987-32991).

Operators

The Bolivian Air Force operated 10 aircraft.

 Burma Volunteer Air Force 
 Dutch East Indies
Royal Netherlands East Indies Army Air Force

The Imperial Japanese Army Air Force operated captured ex-Dutch aircraft.

Turkish Air Force

 The Royal Air Force in India operated the former Burma Volunteer Air Force aircraft

United States Navy

Uruguayan Air Force 9 SNC-1 aircraft operated from 1942 to 1951.

Surviving aircraft
Turkey
 s/n 2615 – CW-22B on static display at the Istanbul Aviation Museum in Istanbul.

United States
 c/n 3707 – CW-22 in storage at the Fantasy of Flight in Polk City, Florida.
 BuNo 05194 – SNC-1 on static display at the National Naval Aviation Museum in Pensacola, Florida.

Uruguay
 SNC-1 on display at the Colonel Jaime Meregalli Aeronautical Museum in Ciudad de la Costa, Canelones.

Specifications (SNC-1)

See also

References

Notes

Bibliography
 Andrade, John. U.S. Military Aircraft Designations and Serials since 1909. Hinckley, UK: Midland Counties Publications, 1979. .
 Bowers, Peter M. Curtiss Aircraft 1907–1947. London: Putnam, 1979. .
 Bowers, Peter M. United States Navy Aircraft since 1911. Annapolis, Maryland: Naval Institute Press, 1990. .
 Donald, David, ed. The Encyclopedia of World Aircraft. Etobicoke, Ontario: Prospero Books, 1997 .
  The Illustrated Encyclopedia of Aircraft (Part Work 1982–1985). London: Orbis Publishing, 1985.

External links

Curtiss-Wright CW-22 Falcon SNC
Curtiss-Wright CW-22R/C-22B CW-22R (Siyah Falconlar-Black Falcons) from Turkish Air Force
Popular Mechanics, November, Navy Fliers Win Their Spurs in New Navy Combat Training Plane early article with photos on US Navy SNC-1

CW-22
1940s United States military trainer aircraft
Single-engined tractor aircraft
Low-wing aircraft
Aircraft first flown in 1940